Lucie Šafářová was the defending champion, but lost to Çağla Büyükakçay in the second round.

Carla Suárez Navarro won the title, defeating Jeļena Ostapenko in the final, 1–6, 6–4, 6–4.

Seeds
The top eight seeds received a bye into the second round.

Draw

Finals

Top half

Section 1

Section 2

Bottom half

Section 3

Section 4

Qualifying

Seeds

Qualifiers

Draw

First qualifier

Second qualifier

Third qualifier

Fourth qualifier

Fifth qualifier

Sixth qualifier

Seventh qualifier

Eighth qualifier

References
Main Draw
Qualifying Draw

2016 WTA Tour
2016 Singles
2016 in Qatari sport